John Farndon (born 1960) is a British writer of books, plays and music. He is best known as a writer of, and contributor to, science books for children.

Biography
Farndon studied Earth sciences and English literature at Jesus College, Cambridge University. He is a Fellow of the 'Royal Literary Fund' at Anglia Ruskin University (Cambridge).

Farndon was described by the Royal Literary Fund as "a writer of non-fiction books, and a playwright, lyricist, composer and literary translator. Spurred by intense intellectual curiosity, his interests range widely and he writes on topics from chemistry to China".

In 2014 the Daily Telegraph reviewed Farndon's book for 'would be' Oxbridge students, Do You Still Think You’re Clever?, where he explains how to tackle the toughest “unanswerable” question and win a university place.

According to the Royal Literary Fund, Farndon has been shortlisted a record four times for the junior Science Book prize.

Publications
His titles include:

 How the Earth Works (1993), Dorling Kindersley (26 Aug. 1999) . Shortlisted for the Rhone-Poulenc Prizes for Science Books - Junior Prize
 What Happens When? (1 November 1996), Scholastic Corporation, . Shortlisted for the Rhone-Poulenc Prizes for Science Books - Junior Prize
 Pocket Encyclopedia, (1997), Dorling Kindersley
 The Kingfisher First Animal Encyclopedia (15 Sept 1998), Contributor, Published by Kingfisher Publications, 
 1000 Things You Should Know About Geography, (1 Aug 2000), Miles Kelly Publishing
 Investigate: Human Body, (2000), Parragon Plus, 
 4000 Things You Should Know, (27 May 2000), Miles Kelly Publishing, 
 Childrens Encyclopedia, (3 July 2000), HarperCollinsChildren'sBooks
 4000 More Things You Should Know, (10 Mar 2001), Miles Kelly Publishing, 
 The Complete Book of the Brain (18 May 2000), Hodder Wayland, . Short listed for the 'Aventis Prizes for Science Books - Junior Prize'.
 Big Book of the Brain, (May 18, 2000), Hodder Wayland
 Science Experiment series; (2001; 2002; 2003), published by Benchmark Publications
 Color;
 Electricity;
 Light and Optics;
 Sound and Hearing;
 Water;
 Gravity,
 Weight and Balance;
 Flight; Awarded the 'Best Books for Children' & 'Editors' Choice' by American Association for the Advancement of Science - 'AAAS Science, Books and Films'  (2002)
 The Human Body; Awarded the 'Best Books for Children' by American Association for the Advancement of Science - 'AAAS Science, Books and Films' (2002)
 Levers, Wheels, and Pulleys;
 Magnetism;
 Solids, Liquids, and Gases;
 Chemicals;
 Motion;
 Rocks and Minerals;
 Time;
 Buoyancy
 The Big Book of Knowledge, (Jan 2002), co-authored with Angela Koo, Parragon, 
 1000 Facts on Human Body, (2 Apr 2002), Miles Kelly Publishing, 
 1000 Things You Should Know About World Geography (1 May 2005), Miles Kelly Publishing, 
 Space (2005)
 Bird Flu, Everything You Should Know, (2005) published by The Disinformation Company,
 Science Investigations: Electricity, (7 September 2006) Hodder Wayland. Shortlisted for Royal Society / Committee on Public Understanding of Science (CoPUS) Science Book prize.
 Do Not Open: An encyclopedia of the world's best-kept secrets (October 25, 2007) published by Dorling Kindersley
 Great Scientists: from Euclid to Stephen Hawking, (2007), 
 The Complete Guide to Minerals, Rocks and Fossils of the World, (1 Jun 2009), Co-author with Steve Parker, Lorenz Educational Press, 
 The World's Greatest Idea, (2010), Icon Books, 
 Do You Think You're Clever?: The Oxford and Cambridge Questions, (3 Jun 2010), Co-author with Libby Purves. Icon Books, . Short-listed for the 'Society of Authors Education Award'.
 The Story of Science and Technology (A Journey Through History), (15 August 2010), Published by Rosen Publishing, 
 What do We Know About Stars and Galaxies, (1 Aug 2011), Raintree Publishing, SBN13 9781410941862
 Atlas of Oceans, on endangered life in the oceans. (2011) Published by Yale University Press in the USA, A & C Black in the UK, Australian Geographic in Australia. Listed by The Globe and Mail (Canada) as a 2011 top ten science book.
 Atlas of Oceans: An Ecological Survey of Underwater Life, (22 Feb 2011), Yale University Press, 
 Atlas of Oceans: A Fascinating Hidden World, (15 Mar 2011), Thomas Reed Publications, 
 Oil, (January 16, 2012), Dorling Kindersley, 
 Discover the Extreme World (2012), Camilla de la Bedoyere, Clive Gifford, John Farndon, Steve Parker, Stewart Ross and Philip Steele, Miles Kelly Publishing, . Sh* Atlas of Oceans, on endangered life in the oceans. Published by Yale University Press in the USA, A & C Black in the UK, Australian Geographic in Australia. Listed by The Globe and Mail (Canada) as a 2011 top ten science book.ortlisted for the Blue Peter Book Award for the 'Best Book with Facts'.
 Super Bright Baby: 50 Things You Really Need to Know, (7 November 2013), Quercus, 
 Do You Still Think You're Clever?: The Oxford and Cambridge Questions, (6 Nov 2014), Icon Books, 
 Do You Still Think You're Clever?: Even More Oxford and Cambridge Questions!, (Feb 17, 2015) Icon Books, 
 The Illustrated Wildlife Encyclopedia: Bugs & Minibeasts: Beetles, Bugs, Butterflies, Moths, Insects, Spiders, (April 7, 2015) contributory author with Barbara Taylor and Jen Green
 Stuff You Need to Know, (30 July 2015), co-author with Rob Beattie, Firefly Books, 
 Project Body (1 Aug 2015), Miles Kelly Publishing Toy edition, . Short listed for 2016 Royal Society's young people's prize.
 Stuff You Should Know, (15 Oct. 2015) QED Publishing, 
 The Illustrated Guide to Rocks & Minerals: How to Find, Identify and Collect the World’s Most Fascinating Specimens, (15 October 2015), Southwater; 
 So, You Think You're Clever? (10 May 2016), Icon Books, 
 The Omnipaedia: Learn Everything you Need to in a Year (1 Dec 2016), Square Peg Publishing,

Awards

Books
 Royal Society/Committee on Public Understanding of Science (CoPUS) - Science Book prize shortlist: How the Earth Works
 Royal Society/Committee on Public Understanding of Science (CoPUS) - Science Book prize shortlist: What Happens When
 Royal Society/Committee on Public Understanding of Science (CoPUS) - Science Book prize shortlist: Investigations: Electricity
 Royal Society/Committee on Public Understanding of Science (CoPUS) - Science Book prize shortlist: Big Book of the Brain
 Royal Society/Committee on Public Understanding of Science (CoPUS) - Science Book prize shortlist - 2016: Project Body

Plays
 Academia Rossica Russian translation prize shortlist: The Naked Guest plus Pushkin poems

Notes and references

References

1960 births
Living people
Science journalists
English male journalists
English science writers
English children's writers
Children's non-fiction writers